Born is a village in the Dutch municipality of Sittard-Geleen. It has a port on the Julianakanaal (Juliana canal). Born is also the site of the car factory VDL Nedcar and the headquarters and European Distribution Center of Mitsubishi Motors Europe. It has a zoo.

See also
82nd Armored Reconnaissance Battalion helped with liberation of Born on 19 September 1944.
 Obbicht en Papenhoven

Gallery

References

Municipalities of the Netherlands disestablished in 2001
Former municipalities of Limburg (Netherlands)
Populated places in Limburg (Netherlands)
Sittard-Geleen